Mystinarius is a genus of fungi in the family Cortinariaceae.

Taxonomy 
The genus was created in 2022 when the family Cortinariaceae, which previously contained only the one genus of Cortinarius was reclassified based on genomic data and split into the genera of Cortinarius, Aureonarius, Austrocortinarius, Calonarius, Cystinarius, Hygronarius, Mystinarius, Phlegmacium, Thaxterogaster and Volvanarius.

The genus is further divided with subgenus and section classifications:

 Mystinarius subgenus Mystinarius.

Etymology 
The name Mystinarius derives from the Latin word 'mysticus' meaning mystical and Cortinarius.

Species 
As of January 2023, the genus is monotypic with only one species of Mystinarius  accepted by Species Fungorum.

 Mystinarius lustrabilis (Moënne-Locc.) Niskanen & Liimat. (2022)

References 

Agaricales genera
Cortinariaceae